Operation Partridge was a British Commando raid during the Second World War. It was carried out during the Italian Campaign by No. 9 Commando as a diversionary raid behind the German lines, to cover the withdrawal of the X Corps in preparation for its proposed assault across the Garigliano river. 

No. 9 Commando were landed on the north shore of the estuary by the Royal Navy during the night of 29/30 December 1943. The commando attacked several German positions before withdrawing across the river in DUKWs, apart from No.4 and No.6  troops who had to cross  upriver by using ropes and swimming. The operation cost the commando nine killed but they did capture 29 prisoners.

References

DAL VOLTURNO A CASSINO - NO. 9 COMMANDO - OPERAZIONE PARTRIDGE

Conflicts in 1944
1944 in Italy
World War II British Commando raids